Vlachava is a village in Kalabaka municipality, Thessaly, Greece. It is located on a hill overlooking Kalambaka and the Meteora monastery complex.

Geography
The town is situated at 910 meters above sea level. A paved road connects it with Skepari (Σκεπάρι) in the northwest and the monasteries of Meteora to the south.

Demographics
The number of residents varies by season. There are generally a few hundred residents. During the summer, the population doubles.

Economy
The primary economic activities are agriculture and tourism.

Attractions
A chapel dedicated to the Panagia (Virgin Mary) is located about 6 km north of the village center.

Notable people
Thymios Vlachavas

See also
Aromanians
Chasia
Antichasia

References

Populated places in Trikala (regional unit)
Aromanian settlements in Greece